River Dee may refer to:

River Dee, Aberdeenshire, Scotland, flowing from the Cairngorms to Aberdeen
River Dee, Wales, flowing through North Wales and through Cheshire in England
River Dee, Cumbria, flowing from the border between Cumbria and North Yorkshire
River Dee, Galloway, in Dumfries and Galloway, Scotland
River Dee (Ireland)
Dee River (Queensland), Australia, a tributary of the Dawson
Dee River (Tasmania), Australia, a tributary of the River Derwent